The Second Cabinet of Abdullah Al-Thani was approved on 22 September 2014 by Libya's democratically elected House of Representatives. The Libyan Supreme Court ruled on 6 November 2014 that the cabinet was "unconstitutional". Prime Minister al-Thani and his government offered their resignation on 13 September 2020 in response to the 2020 Libyan protests. In the context of the Libyan Civil War, the Second Al-Thani cabinet was generally referred to as the Tobruk government.

Composition

See also

First Al-Thani Cabinet

References

External links
Interim Libyan Government - Official Facebook feed

Cabinets established in 2014
2014 establishments in Libya
Government of Libya
Second Libyan Civil War
Political history of Libya